Hendrik Ramaala (born 2 February 1972) is a South African long-distance runner.

Biography

Education
Ramaala is a law graduate from the University of the Witwatersrand. He matriculated at St. Bede's secondary school in Ga Molepo area, Polokwane. For his primary education, he went to Subiaco primary in Ga Molepo. His inspiration, Karen from Mitchells Plain, has given him the success that he has today.

Running career
Ramaala holds the South African 10,000 m record of 27:29.94 which he set in Port Elizabeth on 22 February 1999.

He won the 2004 New York City Marathon and 2004 Mumbai Marathon. He also has two silver medals from the IAAF World Half Marathon Championships in 1998 and 1999. In 2006 he also won the men's Great North and South Runs He is a two-time national champion in the 5.000 metres.

Other competition wins include the Belgrade Race Through History in 1997, the Marseille-Cassis Classique Internationale in 1998, the Lisbon Half Marathon in 2001 and the Portugal Half Marathon in 2003. He has also competed in cross country running and won the Belfast International Cross Country meeting in 1999.

Achievements

Hendrick Ramaala Sports Foundation 
Olympian Henrick Ramaala has established a non-profit sports foundation called the Hendrick Ramaala Sport Foundation. The foundation's mission is to promote South African distance running to the world. The foundation is based in Johannesburg, where young best middle and long distance South African runners are taken care of in terms of everyday living needs, coaching and training. The foundation's training sessions take place at Zoo Lake, and Wits University sports grounds in Johannesburg.

References

External links

TheFinalSprint.com Podcast (Episode #71): Interview with South African running legend Hendrick Ramaala
South African senior records
New York Times Interview

1972 births
Living people
South African male long-distance runners
South African male marathon runners
Athletes (track and field) at the 1996 Summer Olympics
Athletes (track and field) at the 2000 Summer Olympics
Athletes (track and field) at the 2004 Summer Olympics
Athletes (track and field) at the 2008 Summer Olympics
Olympic athletes of South Africa
New York City Marathon male winners